Melabau, also known as Kampong Melabau is a neighbourhood in Brunei-Muara District, Brunei, as well as the capital Bandar Seri Begawan. The population was 288 in 2016. It is one of the villages within Mukim Kianggeh. The postcode is BA2511.

Facilities 

 Ash-Shaliheen Mosque, a mosque built in 2012.
 Prime Minister's Office, a Brunei governmental building.

See also 
 List of neighbourhoods in Bandar Seri Begawan

References 

Villages in Brunei-Muara District
Neighbourhoods in Bandar Seri Begawan